The 1916–17 Idaho men's basketball team represented the University of Idaho during the  college basketball season. Idaho was led by first-year head coach  and played their home games on campus at the  Armory and Gymnasium in Moscow, Idaho.

Idaho was  overall.

Alumnus Edmundson, a Moscow native (and an Olympian in track in 1912) led the basketball program for two seasons, then coached at Washington in Seattle for decades, starting in 1920.

References

External links
Sports Reference – Idaho Vandals: 1916–17 basketball season
Gem of the Mountains: 1918 (spring 1917) University of Idaho yearbook – 1916–17 basketball season
Idaho Argonaut – student newspaper – 1917 editions

Idaho Vandals men's basketball seasons
Idaho
Idaho
Idaho